Hamada is both a Japanese surname and a given name, as well as a common Arabic first name popular mostly in Egypt. Notable people with the name include:

People with the surname
Asahi Hamada (born 2001), Japanese Kpop idol
Ayako Hamada (born 1981), Japanese-Mexican professional wrestler, daughter of Gran Hamada
, Japanese professional wrestler
, Japanese film and television actor
, birth name of Halna, Japanese singer
, retired Japanese judoka
, the 29th President of the University of Tokyo
, samurai retainer to the Date clan
, Japanese boxer
, former member of the Supreme Court of Japan from 2001 until 2006
, Japanese female rock singer, songwriter and producer.
, Japanese singer and actress
, Japanese television host and comedian
, Japanese politician
, female Japanese taekwondo practitioner
 Mido Hamada (born 1971), German Egyptian actor
, Japanese table tennis player
 Mizuki Hamada (born 1990), American-born Japanese football defender
 Robert Hamada (professor) (born 1937), professor of finance at University of Chicago
 Robert Hamada (woodworker) (born 20th century), Hawaiian woodturner
 , Japanese politician
, Japanese politician
, Japanese singer-songwriter
, Japanese potter and Living National Treasure
 Shoko Hamada (disambiguation), multiple people
, Japanese judoka
, Japanese footballer
, professional Japanese baseball player
, Japanese rower
 Xóchitl Hamada (born 1970), Japanese professional wrestler, daughter of Gran Hamada
, Japanese politician and member of the cabinet

Fictional characters
 Hiro Hamada, main protagonist from the movie Big Hero 6
 Tadashi Hamada, brother of the main protagonist from the movie Big Hero 6

People with the given name
 Hamada Helal (born 1980), Egyptian singer
 Hamada Jambay (born 1975), French Malagasy football player
 Hamada Madi (born 1965), Secretary General of the Indian Ocean Commission, former Prime Minister of Comoros

Japanese-language surnames